is a Japanese television series produced by Tsuburaya Productions which celebrates the 50th anniversary of the company and is part of the New Ultraman Retsuden programming block on TV Tokyo. It was succeeded by later instalments Ultraman Ginga S and Ultra Fight Victory.

Protagonists

Hikaru Raido
The main protagonist,  is a teenager that moved to London due to his parents' desires to become musicians. He returned and took a visit back to his hometown, Furoboshi, during the summer break after receiving a strange vision, which led him to the possession of Ginga Spark, an ancient item that allows him to unite with Ultraman Ginga. Due to this, he was guided by Ultraman Taro to defeat and collect Spark Dolls that used by evil-hearted people, at the same time trying to discover the perpetrator behind these chaos. After every Spark Dolls had been freed from their curses, Hikaru was tasked by Ginga to go on an adventure around the Earth and meet him again once his job had done.

Two years later in Ultraman Ginga S, he returned to Japan again after receiving another vision during his travel in Yucatán Peninsula, Mexico. He was dragged into the battle again when a new villain, Exceller wanted to usurp the Earth's supply of Victoriums. Hikaru joined the attack team UPG and reunites with his old friend, Tomoya and Taro as well as Ultraman Ginga. He also receives aid from Show, a Victorian prince who becomes the host of Ultraman Victory. At the end of the series, when both Hikaru and Show defeated Vict Lugiel, the two parted ways and Hikaru resumes his travel on the world.

During the event of Ultraman Ginga S The Movie, Hikaru returns to UPG after a year travelling abroad but once again joining forces with Show / Victory after Etelgar tried to imprison their Ultras. The two were trained by Ultraman Zero to cooperate with each other and gained the Ultra Fusion Brace when their training had been approved by him. Along with Zero, they freed the imprisoned Heisei Ultras and fought against Etelgar and his army of Eteldummy. In Ultra Fight Victory, Hikaru/Ginga was captured and made as a hostage in Satellite Golgotha by Yapool as a plot to revive Juda. Ace tried to free Ginga but Victory Killer overpowered him until Show/Victory Knight saved them. Soon Hikaru joined the Showa Ultras to fight Super Grand King Spectre while Victory defeated Juda Spectre.

Hikaru's returning appearance in Ultraman Ginga S is due to his actor's wish to replay his role as Hikaru once again. Negishi is also a fan of Ultraman Cosmos in his childhood and is delighted to have acted alongside Taiyo Sugiura, Musashi Haruno's actor in the Ginga S Movie.

Tomoya Ichijōji
 is a child prodigy of the Ichijōji Group that moved to the Furuhoshi sometime before Hikaru's arrival. He is talented in academic and sports but lives under his parents' shadow after his dream of becoming just like his father had been denied. He was given the Dark Dummy Spark and Jean-Killer's Spark Doll, using it to attack Ginga by controlling the robot with Gunpad. Having kidnapped Taro, Tomoya tried to use him to defeat Hikaru but failed and was banished when his service was no longer needed. Hikaru gives him a dream, to surpass Ultraman Ginga and this becomes Tomoya's motivation to redeem his past mistakes, thus purifying Jean-Killer as Jean-Nine.

During the events of Ultraman Ginga Theater Special: Ultra Monster ☆ Hero Battle Royal!, his drawings of Ultra Monsters manifested into fake Spark Dolls by the mysterious cosmic energy, as he invited his friend to play with them until the fake Spark Dolls reverted into his drawing book.

Two years later in Ginga S, Tomoya joined the attack team UPG in order to combat against Exceller. He works as their analyzer and stations in the Ichijōji Lab. He welcomes Hikaru into the team and was originally the only one beside Taro to know of Hikaru and Show's identities as Ultraman Ginga and Victory respectively. Meanwhile, after Android One-Zero, Exceller's former minion sacrificed her own to sabotage Vict Lugiel for the Ultras to finish him in the finale, Tomoya salvaged her Victorium Necklace, which contained her imprints and memories that allow him to rebuild her.

Tomoya Ichijōji is portrayed by the main dancer of Bullet Train .

Sho
 is one of the main characters of Ultraman Ginga S and is a young Victorian that was sent to retrieve the Victorium after they were stolen by Exceller. He was given the Victory Lancer, allowing him to become Ultraman Victory. At first, Show appeared to be stoic and cold hearted due to his disgust for humanity despite his mother's wish for him to make peace with them. He is also hesitated to use the Ultra's Ultlance ability cause him unable to fully manifest Victory's full power but manages to do so after correcting his mistake. After both Ginga and Victory managed to defeat Vict Lugiel, Sho and Hikaru parted ways.

During the event of Ultraman Ginga S The Movie, when Etelgar proves to be a bigger threat to both Hikaru and Show, Ultraman Zero gives them an intensive training and granted them the Ultra Fusion Brace, allowing them to become Ultraman Gingavictory to defeat Etelgar and his Eteldummy armies alongside other past Heisei Ultras. At the end, he was given a membership in UPG by Yoshiaki.

In Ultra Fight Victory, when Yapool planned to revive Juda, he was bestowed the Knight Timbre by Hikari to become Ultraman Victory Knight in order to stop Juda and return the stolen Victorium energies. After the whole ordeal was done, Show tried to return the Knight Timbre, but Hikari refused and allows him to keep it for the Earth's future.

According to Kiyotaka Uji, "I grew up watching Ultraman and playing with the toys, I know now that there are no impossible dreams. I will do my best to now be part of this generation's children, protecting peace and fighting evil enemies."

Furoboshi Town Residents

Supporting Characters
: One of Hikaru's childhood friends. She dreams of becoming a confectioner and worked as the Ginga Shrine priestess during the summer break. Her dream to become a confectioner was due to the strained relationship she had with her father, wanting him to taste her mother's sweets again. During episode eight, her desire to help Hikaru granted her the Ginga Light Spark, allowing her to become Red King to face Zaragas when Hikaru was left hopeless after the Ginga Spark being stolen. She was given the chance to become Jashrin with Chigusa and Kenta to fight Antlar and at that time, she discovered her father as the true identity of Ultraman / Ultraseven Dark, further straining their relationship. It was at this time where her heart was manipulated by Gray into becoming Super Grand King until Hikaru managed to bring her back. Eventually, Seiichirō make amends for his mistake to Misuzu during the end of the series, thus reuniting their bond as a family. Two years later in Ginga S, Misuzu successfully achieve her lifelong dream and visited the now UPG officer Hikaru. She also manage to convince Android One-Zero, Exceller's former minion to turn over a new leaf and granted her a new name, Mana.
: One of Hikaru's childhood friends and an aspiring photographer. He initially had a crush on Misuzu but rejected it and choose Chigusa instead. During episode 5, he was corrupted by Alien Valkie out of his fear of being betrayed and almost DarkLived into Doragory until managed to return his senses. His desire to help those in need in the series grants him the Ginga Light Spark and allows him to UltLive as Jashrin (along with Misuzu and Chigusa) and Ultraman Tiga. In the events of Extra Episode, Kenta and Chigusa became Ultraman Tiga and Ultraman respectively to stop Alien Magma and Zetton from blowing Japan but their efforts were almost futile until Ginga returned to their aid. Two years later in Ginga S, he becomes the recorder for Chigusa's performances as an idol, marking his first step into the world of photography. He as well record Chigusa's performance to cheer up and encourage the victims of Vict Lugiel's attack to resist against his reign of terror.
: One of Hikaru's childhood friend and dreams of becoming an idol. She secretly harbours a crush on Kenta. During episode 4, her jealousy for Misuzu due to being picked as a model instead of her allows Alien Valkie to corrupt her heart and becomes Ragon but Hikaru managed to return her back to her senses. Her desire to help those in need in the series granted her the Ginga Light Spark, allowing her to become Jashrin (along with Kenta and Misuzu) and Ultraman. In the events of Extra Episode, Chigusa and Kenta became Ultraman and Ultraman Tiga respectively to stop Alien Magma and Zetton from blowing Japan but their efforts were almost futile until Ginga returned to their aid. She became Ultraman again in the Mountain Peanuts short story in order to defeat Nosferu. Two years later in Ginga S, Chigusa finally succeeded her life in becoming an idol, first singing Ultraman Ginga no Uta. She also made another performance to cheer up and encourage the victims of Vict Lugiel's attack to resist against his reign of terror.

Minor Characters
: Hikaru's grandfather, Hotsuma is the priest for the Ginga Shrine. When it was destroyed in a meteorite shower, Hotsuma moved the shrine to the Furuhoshi Elementary School to guide its relic, Ginga Spark. While he is also aware of Hikaru's identity as Ginga and the series' plot, Hotsuma is also revealed to be a Chosen One picked by the Ginga Spark. He helps Hikaru and his friend by exposing Kyōko Shirai, the school's principal as the host of Dark Lugiel.
Lugiel feed on her darkness, as well as her former students that walked into the wrong path and thus allowing him to be revived. She was finally freed from his control when she refused Lugiel to use her students again, allowing her to gain a Ginga Light Spark and return Taro into his original form.
: Misuzu's father, he prioritizes work than his families, causing a strain in his relationship with his daughter. He originally plans to buy the Furuhoshi Elementary School compound and trapped inside it, as well as given the Spark Dolls of Ultraman and Ultra Seven by Gray to become Ultraman Dark and Ultraseven Dark. He defeated Hikaru in their first encounter and invited him in his quest to rule over everything but rejected and defeated by Hikaru. His daughter further resented him after being caught as the dark Ultras' identity red handed and caused her to be manipulated as Super Grand King. Realised his mistake, Seiichirō became Ultraseven again to help Ginga reach Misuzu but failed. In the last episode, Seiiichirō apologized to Misuzu as their family relationship started anew.
: A germophobic architectural designer, Shingo is one of Seiichirō's subordinates. Once he learned that he was trapped in the space time continuum with everyone in the Furuhoshi Elementary School, his desire to escape allows Gray to manipulate him into Zaragas. He was returned to normal by Ultraman Ginga and Red King (Misuzu). In the final, he and Tomomi happily decided not to demolish this school after the Furuhoshi Town residents voiced their objection.
: A representative of the Ichinotani construction company, Tomomi is one of Seiichirō's subordinates. Once she learned that she was trapped in the space time continuum with everyone in the Furuhoshi Elementary School, her desire to escape allows Gray to manipulate her into Antlar. She was returned to normal by Ultra Seven Dark (Seiichirō), who betrayed her. In the final, she and Shingo happily decided not to demolish this school after the Furuhoshi Town residents voiced their objection.

Furuhoshi Elementary School Graduates
: Nicknamed  by fellow residents, he is a patrolling police officer and always sighted the battle between Ultraman Ginga and the DarkLived monsters, not knowing their tie to Hikaru and his friends until the middle of the series. While patrolling, he likes singing the school's song, which became useful in the final episode as it allows everyone to resist against Dark Lugiel.
 and : A pair of truck drivers, the two were known for littering garbage around the mountains. This allows Alien Valkie to manipulate their hearts into Thunder Darambia, until Hikaru as Ultraman Ginga stopped them. In the final episode, the duo had regretted their past actions and worked as botanists to decorate the city.
: A Furuhoshi Elementary School graduate, Yagami is a biker that likes bullying town residents. His darkness was manipulated by Alien Valkie into Kemur-Man to attack Misuzu until he was stopped by Hikaru, later returned to himself by  Ultraman Ginga. In the final episode, he redeemed from his past acts and wants to go globe-throttling with his bike.
: A long time friend of Kenta and Chigusa, Yūka wants to become a fashion designer but she fells into despair when she realises that her dream may crumble in the future, causing her to become an arsonist. She met Kenta and Chigusa in their way to buy fireworks and tricks Kenta into bringing to Hikaru's room for photo shooting, only for her to have been already manipulated by Alien Valkie and turned into King Pandon. After Ginga reverted her to normal, she revealed that her true darkness is loneliness. In the final episode, she redeems from her past acts and continues to become a fashion designer without a worry in her sight.
: A childhood friend of Taichi and a professional boxer, earning the nickname . However, he was caught in a gambling incident and his despair over his dream crushed allows Gray to manipulate his evil heart as Dark Galberos. After Ginga defeated him, Gō helps Hikaru and his team to defend against Gray and in the finale, he decided to restart his career as a professional boxer without regarding the previous incident.

UPG
The Ultra Party Guardians, abbreviated as UPG, is an attack team under the International Defense Organization, whose main goal is to fight against monster threats and studying the Victorium crystals. During the season climax, the International Defense Organization fired all of its members and took possession of the Victorium Cannon in hopes of exploiting the Victorium energies until the base was converted into Vict Lugiel after a revived Dark Lugiel combined with it. In Ginga S The Movie, another Live Base was created a year after the previous one's destruction but in Shin Ultraman Retsuden, the base's command center sport another appearance, which took on the similar one to that of SSSP's base from Ultraman. Their main catchphrase is  when receiving orders. The team's arsenal includes , a handheld communicator which can also serve as a starting key for the UPG vehicles and an energy pistol called .

UPG Members
: UPG captain. Jinno is a calm and pacifist captain. He is aware of Hikaru's relation with Ultraman Ginga and reveals this in episode 14. Later, when Kōyama took charge of UPG and their ultimate weapon being stolen by Dark Lugiel, Jinno criticized him for strongly believe in weapons as an answer for peace. Ohura stated that he felt honored to become an attack team captain and is delighted to represent himself as an adult fan of the Ultra Series.
: Female member of UPG. She has an abnormal strength level that allows her to get on par with Android One-Zero. Arisa is mainly in charge for the preparations of UPG vehicles, Schnauzer and Malamute and has a running gag of punching Gōki whenever she felt stressed out. She was once a member of the International Defense Organization, being the main reason she retained her position when Kōyama took over the team and fired almost all members. Yukari herself had viewed her role as an opportunity to get closer with the children
: A Karate expert, he is in charge of the field combat. He is welcoming towards newer members of UPG and treats them very well as a senior. In episode 12, he was revealed to be a huge fan of Chigusa.
: Originally , Exceller's android enforcer and the secondary antagonist of the first half of Ultraman Ginga S. She was tasked by her master to steal the Victoriums to revive Dark Lugiel and with the Chibull Spark, it allows her to MonsLive with Spark Dolls. During the first half, she was commanded by her master to commit a kamikaze attack by exploding in the UPG Live Base but was stopped by Shou while the UPG members were busy reviving Ultraman Ginga and Victory. She became a deserter in the second half but Misuzu, Hikaru's childhood friend encourages her to turn over a new leaf, and she does so by renaming herself Mana. She watches over Ginga and Victory's battle over the second half and in the finale, she fakes her betrayal by pretending to serve Exceller again, and sabotages Vict Lugiel's inner system for the Ultras to finish him at the cost of her own. However, her imprints and memories were rescued by Tomoya, which allows him to rebuild Mana as she becomes one of the members of UPG. According to Ultraman Ginga S producer Tsugumi Kitamura, Mogami's successful audition for the role is partly because of him, preferring her "boyish" outlook. Mogami added that she had also trained for her roles as an android, such as "not blinking her eyes".

Vehicles
UPG-EV1 : A Nissan Leaf-based patrol car, which is frequently shown in the series. This car can also be auto-piloted by moving itself towards the driver via the use of Smart Ceaver. By connecting its engine to the Charge Gun, it would turn into , which allowed UPG officers to fire a stronger beam attacks, successfully gigantic opponents such as Chiburoid-controlled Inpelaizers.
UPG-EV2 : A Nissan NV200-based patrol minivan which first appeared in episode 14 of Ginga S. It serve as an alternative computer to the UPG after their Live Base were seized by International Defense Organization and later by Exceller's army.

International Defense Organization
 is a military organization behind UPG's foundation. Their main objective is to exploit the Victorium's powers for military purposes, and has no qualms in killing an Ultra Warrior, believing them to be equal threat to a monster. This was however stopped when the Victorium Cannon they had built was exploited by Dark Lugiel.

: The secretary of the International Defense Organization and old friend of Arisa, he took over the UPG and fired all members but Arisa in order to initiate the Victorium Cannon, which functions by usurping the Victorium as a weapon. He believes that UPG's modus operandi were less effective and thinks of weapons as an answer for peace. However, when it fallen into the hands of Victor Lugiel, he fell into despair after having realised the error of his ways.

Shizukugaoka Residents
 is a fictional town and the main setting in Ultraman Ginga S. The town is known for its constant development in the urban area and is actually the original location of the Victorian people before moving underground, thus explaining the surfacing of Victorium Crystal in said place. The reason of UPG being formed in this area is due to the wish of International Defense Organization planning to exploit the Victorium before the plan was cancelled due to Exceller, later Dark Lugiel exploiting their weapon.

: A pregnant woman that Gōki encountered while he fights against Yapool's influence. He soon drives a car and tries to bring her to a hospital before Yapool could kill her. Soon after Vict Lugiel's destruction, she safely gives birth to a child.
: A salaryman who was trapped in the form of Gan Q after being forced to become one via Alien Akumania Muerte's influence and its Spark Doll. Yoshida as Gan Q helped a local boy named Satoru to ride a bike before being controlled by Muerte in a rampaging spree. After Muerte's destruction, Yoshida was brought to normal and happily witnessed Satoru riding his bike.
: A local boy who was taught to ride a bike with the help of Yoshida, who at that time trapped in the form of Gan Q. Satoru has no problems with accepting Yoshida despite the man's gruesome appearance feared several citizen he came across. After Ginga Strium returned Yoshida to his original appearance, Satoru keeps Gan Q's Spark Doll as a memento.

Victorian
The  are an ancient race that lived in an underground civilization where there is no day or night. To compensate for the lack of sunlight, Victoriums were used as source of light, albeit similar in a manner of lightstones. The concept of money also seemed never existed in their culture as shown in episode 3, where Lepi attempted to trade a chocolate wafer with an apple at a shop. However, they are also capable of displaying psionic abilities, hinting that they are Espers.
: The queen and a priestess of the Victorian, Kisara desired peace amongst Victorian and all lifeforms. When the Victorium theft had been reported, she sent Show to the surface in hopes to reclaim them.
: Show's childhood friend who serves Kisara. She and Lepi always sneaked out from the Victorian kingdom to the surface, much to his dismay as he concerns about their safety. Sakuya was employed into the UPG as the representatives for the Victorians in the human society. She was portrayed by 
: Sakuya's little brother, Lepi develops curiosity for Earth culture and with Sakuya always sneak out until Show gave them the permission to do so. He was portrayed by 
: Kisara's adviser. While seemingly weak, he is incredibly fast in thinking and fighting with his personal katana, which was kept hidden in his walking stick. He was portrayed by 
: A rogue Victorian, long ago in her childhood during the Victorian civil war, she was banned to another dimension with other opposing group that wanted the use of Victory Lancer. She returned and was given the Chibull Spark that allowed her to become Gomora in order to enact her revenge but developed a change of heart when Shepherdon, her childhood friend protected her.

Spark Dolls
 are the embodiments of Ultramen and other Ultra Monsters. All of them were known for being combatants of the Dark Spark Wars until they were cursed into said figures by the battle's orchestrator, Dark Lugiel. Eventually after floating in space, they fall into the Furuhoshi town's mountainside as meteor shower. While some of them were collected by Dark Lugiel, others still scattered around the woods. A few Spark Dolls like Ultraman Taro are  Through the power of Dark Lugiel's Dark Spark and its replicates, the Dark Dummy Sparks, it allows the user to become one with the Spark Dolls, or in certain cases, can also corrupt one should the Spark Doll is an Ultraman or any other Ultra Hero. Eventually after Lugiel's demise, the Spark Dolls were freed from the curse and returns to space.

Two years later, Alien Chibull Exceller revealed to have his own set of Spark Dolls, but never shown on how did he acquired them.

After the end of Ultra Fight Victory, which was Ginga's last succeeding series, a new Ultra Series was released under the name Ultraman X. In said series, it also reused the Spark Doll concept despite different in origin.

Ultras

Ultraman Ginga

 is the titular Ultra of the series. Hailed from the future, he and Dark Lugiel were originally a single celestial entity. However, their contradicting ideas and point of view towards life forms (Lugiel sees them as threats while Ginga sees them as part of the universe) had made them split, with Lugiel bearing the darkness and Ginga bearing the light. Ultraman Ginga arrived late to stop Lugiel as he had successfully frozen the Ultras Heroes and the Ultra Monsters into Spark Doll as the fight between the two ended in a tie, causing Ginga to be imprisoned in Spark Doll and Lugiel weakened. His main weapon, the  became the sacred item that worshipped by Hotsuma Raido and later picked Hikaru as his human host due to his hidden potential. After Ginga defeated the revived Dark Lugiel in the final episode, he advised Hikaru to go on an adventure and he will return once his job accomplished, as he went to space with the freed life forms. He returned again in the extra episode to assist Kenta (Ultraman Tiga) and Chigusa (Ultraman) against Alien Magma and Zetton. Later, he safely returned Kenta and Chigusa to Earth while Alien Magma and Zetton seek apprenticeship in the Ultra Warrior, to which the latter agreed.

He has seven finishers, all depending on the color of his :
: Ginga's original finisher, which is performed in an L-style beam position.
: An attack which requires him to charge a large amount of electricity before forming a disc and throw it towards the opponent.
: An attack which allows him to summon multiple fireball projections before launching it towards the enemy.
: A light sword, by striking it onto the ground, Ginga can summon a series of shockwaves before it hit the opponent.
: A purple stream attack launched from his forehead. First used to pursue Jean-Killer in space.
: An energy beam attack which is able to destroy heavily armed opponents such as Super Grand King. During its first use, Ginga is able to destroy the barrier that had imprison several people in the Furuhoshi Elementary School.
: Ginga's strongest attack, by absorbing several of its energies, he can launch it through his Color Timer. This is used to counter Dark Lugiel's attack and therefore ending his reign of terror.

In Ginga S, Ginga returns to Earth after Exceller made his move to revive Dark Lugiel. He achieved the form  with the help of Taro, who loaned the Ultra Brothers' powers to him. He also receives an aid from Victory, an Ultra that native to the Earth. But as the battle against Exceller and Lugiel ended once more, he loses the form again and returned to space. As Ginga Strium, Ginga is considered a  combination (due to the use of Strium Brace/Ultraman Taro); his ability perimeters is heightened to be on par with that of Victory, possessing enhanced ESP and his fighting stance replicated that of Taro. Although retaining his original attacks, Ginga is capable of using the finishers of all six Ultra Brothers and utilize  by combining their attacks. His loaned power from the Ultra Brothers are:
Ultraman: , 
Zoffy: , 
Ultraseven: , 
Ultraman Jack: , 
Ultraman Ace: , 
Ultraman Taro: , 

His grunts in the series were provided by Takuya Negishi, Hikaru's actor, although Sugita did perform his own variation of Ultraman Ginga's grunt in episode 155 of Shin Ultraman Retsuden. He is ranked 14th in the 2013 Ultra Hero popularity poll with a total of 1975 voters.

Ultraman Taro

Ultraman Victory
 is the ancient Ultra and protector of the Victorian. Before Sho, there was an unnamed user who used Victory's power to stop Shepherdon from rampaging the Victorian kingdom during the civil war, using . Ultraman Victory's performances are comparably higher than that of Ginga. Apart from that, he can perform , which allows him to manifest a Spark Doll's power through his right hand. Among them are:
: A gigantic fist knuckle themed after EX Red King's right arm. It allows Ultraman Victory to replicate the monster's own Flame Road.
: A whip themed after Eleking's Tail, Victory can used it to constrain enemies and delivers electric-based attacks.
: An arm cannon themed after King Joe Custom's Pedanium Launcher, which allows him to launch rapid-fire energy bullets.
: A whip themed after Gudon's whip arms, it allows Victory to use whip-based attacks.
: Sadola's pincer arms, it also gives Victory the ability to elongate his arms.
: A sword themed after Shepherdon itself, Victory is capable of using Victorium-themed attacks and initiate , his strongest attack.
: An arm themed after that of Hyper Zetton, it allows Victory to replicate one of Hyper Zetton's attacks, .

This weapon functions by drawing out the inner Victorium of Sho and manifested it through Victory. This form has three finishers:

Ultraman Victory is voiced by Kiyotaka Uji, Sho's actor.

Ultraman Gingavictory
 is the fusion initiated by both Ultramen Ginga and Victory. It was first shown during the Ultraman Ginga S: Showdown! Ultra 10 Warriors!!, which made after Hikaru and Sho were trained by Ultraman Zero to cooperate. Gingavictory first defeated a gigantic copy of Dark Lugiel and joined the other Ultra Warriors in fighting Etelgar. After Cosmos rescued Arina, Gingavictory launched an all-out attack on Etelgar and pursued him to space before defeating him for good. It was accessed again in Ultra Fight Victory to fight against Yapool, although the latter managed to revive Juda in his dying breath. However, the fusion didn't last longer when Super Grand King Spectre attacked them, forcing him to split.

Being a Super Ultraman, his powers and ESP-based techniques are heightened beyond normal and retains the abilities from his two components, such as Ginga's telepathic contact and Victory's Ultlance. Apart from that, he also possess the powers of past 8 Heisei Ultras and combining their powers to perform :
Ultraman Cosmos: , 
Ultraman Nexus: , 
Ultraman Max: , 
Ultraman Mebius: , 
Ultraman Zero: , 

Ultraman Gingavictory is voiced by Takuya Negishi and Kiyotaka Uji.

Ultra Brothers
The  is a team of six legendary Showa Ultramen that have protected the peace of planet Earth and space. They were also the participants of the Dark Spark Wars and all of them fallen as they had tried to protect the youngest member, Taro from the wave, making him the only sentient Spark Doll in the series. Of course, following Lugiel's defeat, they were released from the curse and returned to their original forms. In Ultraman Ginga S, as Taro headed to Earth after detecting a new threat, his Ultra Brother comrades loaned him their powers as a sign of support until the final episode, where Taro's mission on Earth had done, as the borrowed powers had been returned to their rightful owners.
: The leader of the Ultra Brothers. He contributed his M87 Ray and Z-Ray to Taro in Ginga S.
: See Ultraman (character)#Galaxy Crisis Era and later on
: See Ultraseven (character)#Subsequent appearances in later Galaxy Crisis Era
:  See here.
: He contributed his Metallium Ray and Punch Laser to Taro in Ginga S. Later in Ultra Fight Victory, he was among the Ultras sent by Ultraman King to stop Yapool from reviving Juda. Learning that Yapool had Ace Killer taken care of his captive, Ginga, Ace tried to rescue him but overpowered after the Ace Killer he fought turned out to be Victory Killer. He was healed by Victory Knight after the latter rescued Ginga and helps by fighting Super Grand King Spectre.
Ultraman Taro: See above

New Ultra 5 Brothers
 is a so-called "Ultra Brother" team consisting of fake Spark Dolls lived by Tomoya (Ultraman), Kenta (Ultraseven), Chigusa (Ultraman Tiga), Misuzu (Ultraman Taro) and Hikaru (Ultraman Ginga). Originally trying to fight each other over the strongest Ultra Warrior, they united against the Bug Ray evil Ultra Warriors in order to escape the virtual reality.

Other Showa Ultras
: The father of Ultraman Taro, he was also a victim of the Dark Spark, having tried to protect his son from Dark Lugiel. While Taro descended into despair, Father of Ultra encouraged him not to give up, allowing Taro to regain his confidence and had the Furuhoshi Town residents to support him in against Dark Lugiel.
: The mother of Ultraman Taro, she was also a victim of the Dark Spark, having tried to protect her son from Dark Lugiel. While Taro descended into despair, Mother of Ultra encouraged him not to give up, allowing Taro to regain his confidence and had the Furuhoshi Town residents to support him in against Dark Lugiel.
: The royal prince and a survivor from the destruction of Nebula L-77, Leo was commanded by Ultraman King to stop Yapool from reviving Juda. He is the teacher of Ultraman Zero and learns about Ultraman Ginga and Victory from him. During the climax of the Ultra Fight Victory, he and several Ultras left behind to fight Super Grand King Spectre while Victory Knight pursued Juda Spectre.
: Leo's younger brother and a survivor from the destruction of Nebula L-77, Astra was commanded by Ultraman King to stop Yapool from reviving Juda. Like Leo, he is also a teacher of Ultraman Zero and learns about Ultraman Ginga and Victory from him. During the climax of the Ultra Fight Victory, he and several Ultras left behind to fight Super Grand King Spectre while Victory Knight pursued Juda Spectre.
: The godlike figure of the Land of Light, during the Ultraman Ginga S Movie, he requested Ultraman Zero to give the Ultra Fusion Brace to Ultraman Ginga and Victory to assist them. In Ultra Fight Victory, he sensed a great disturbance in the space, knowing that Yapool attempted to revive Juda. He soon sent four Ultras, Ace, Leo, Astra and Hikari to stop him.

Past Heisei Ultras and Ultra Hosts
: See here
: During the events of Ultraman Ginga S Movie, he was among the Heisei Ultras that held captive by Etelgar until the UPG members freed them. While the other Heisei Ultras make way to Etelgar's tower, Dyna, Tiga and Gaia left behind to fight against Five King. He assumed  and finished Five King with  before joining the others and using  to destroy Etelgar's castle.
: During the events of Ultraman Ginga S Movie, he was among the Heisei Ultras that held captive by Etelgar until the UPG members freed them. While the other Heisei Ultras make way to Etelgar's tower, Gaia, Tiga and Dyna left behind to fight against Five King.
: During the events of Ultraman Ginga S Movie, Cosmos was Etelgar's recent victim of petrifaction. The separated Musashi managed to escape and join forces with UPG to rescue the demon's captives, He and Gingavictory managed to get at the top of Etelgar's castle and Cosmos purified Arina from Etelgar's brainwashing. As the event was over, Cosmos return Arena to her hoemworld.
: See here
: During the events of Ultraman Ginga S Movie, he was among the Heisei Ultras that held captive by Etelgar until the UPG members freed them. While the other Heisei Ultras make way to Etelgar's tower, he was forced to left behind to fight against Alien Sran. In the Ginga S Movie, he was voiced by Kenta Matsumoto, who previously voiced the young Taro and Thunder Darambia in Ginga.
: See here
: A scientist of the Land of Light and a member of Space Garrison, he was partnered with Mebius during his time on Earth. In Ultra Fight Victory, he was among the Ultras sent by Ultraman King to stop Juda. He invented the Knight Timbre as a weapon to seal Juda and bestow it to Ultraman Victory along with his task after rescuing him from Aribunta. Once Juda had been destroyed and the stolen Victorium returned, Hikari decided to leave the Knight Timbre in Show's possession and leaves, confidently believing that the Earth's future is safe with them.
: See Ultraman Zero#Subsequent history

Supporting Heroes/Ultra Monsters

Jean-nine
 is a mecha robot belonging to Tomoya. One of the casualties of the Dark Spark War, it landed on Lugiel's hands and was given to the youth, corrupted back into  by the boy's darkness of being a dream hater. Eventually, after Ginga destroyed the Dark Dummy Spark and for Tomoya's dream to surpass Ginga, Jean-killer was purified once again into Jean-nine, assisting Ginga in his battles. Followed by Dark Lugiel's demise, Jean-nine and the rest of the Spark Dolls were freed and bids farewell to Tomoya, indicated by the word "GOODBYE FRIEND" emblazoned on the Gunpad.

Compared to its incarnation in Ultraman Zero Gaiden: Killer the Beatstar, this Jean-nine is mute and rarely communicates with Tomoya via the words on his Gunpad. This Jean-nine also possess several abilities that differs from its M78 incarnation. Among them are the ability to transform into a fighter jet called  and possess threads on its back.

Shepherdon
 is an underground monster and the protector of the Victorians and the Victoriums. Long ago, during the Victorian's civil war, Shepherdon wreak havoc as a side effect from the battle, however, Ultraman Victory managed to calm the monster and the war was forgotten from everyone's memories. Shepherdon assist Victory multiple times in his battle, and reunited with Hiyori, its old friend but loses its life by Bolst/Verokron. However, its remains reconstitute into , allowing it to assist Victory even if his life had already ended.

In Ultra Fight Victory, Shepherdon was briefly revived by Victory Knight via the Knight Timbre, assisting it to attack Victory Killer and Lunaticks. Before returning to a Spark Doll once more, the monster replenished the energies of Ultraman Ginga and Ace.

Shepherdon's main ability is to launch energy attacks from its mouth. Its Victorium Crystal is 10 times stronger than normal Victorium and it allowed Shepherdon to utilize its strongest attack, .

Jace
 is an alien who defected from Exceller after he was sent to turn humans violent. Living under his human form , he becomes a fan of Chigusa Kuno (Hikaru's childhood friend) and saves her from Bolst after the latter was sent to capture Jace. He willingly puts himself under UPG's custody but runs away to save Chigusa and becomes giant, teaming up with Ultramen Ginga Strium and Victory to defeat Bolst/Zoa-Muruchi. Jace was released by UPG to rejoin the human society and was seen again supporting Chigusa's performance during Vict Lugiel's attack.

Antagonists

Dark Lugiel
 is the main antagonist in Ultraman Ginga and the final villain in Ultraman Ginga S. Hailed from the future, he and Ultraman Ginga were originally a single celestial entity. However, their contradicting ideas and point of view towards life forms (Lugiel sees them as threats while Ginga sees them as part of the universe) had made them split, with Lugiel bearing the darkness and Ginga bearing the light. Dark Lugiel orchestrated the Dark Spark Wars, with Ginga arrived late to stop Lugiel as he had successfully frozen the Ultras Heroes and the Ultra Monsters into Spark Doll and the fight between the two ended in a tie, causing Ginga to be imprisoned in Spark Doll and Lugiel weakened. His main weapon, the  allows him to turn any being into Spark Doll or corrupt one. Following the tie of his battle, he was imprisoned in the Dark Spark and falls to the mount of Furuhoshi. He possessed Kyōko Shirai to absorb her and her former students' darkness in order to revive himself. By collecting fallen Spark Dolls on the mountain, he utilized several of them as his minions to distribute the Dark Dummy Sparks to corrupted individuals, allowing him to feed their darkness and revive himself. He reveals himself in the final episode of the series, destroying the school area and easily overpowering Ginga before he faced against Taro, who would later revive Ginga's strength. Their heated battle was further brought to the moon where he met his demise, thus lifting the curse he placed on the Spark Dolls.

Unfortunately two years later in Ginga S, his body was sought by Exceller in order to invade the Earth. He was finally killed again by the combined forces of Ultraman Ginga Strium and Ultraman Victory.

Dark Lugiel was voiced by Tomokazu Sugita, who also voiced his half, Ultraman Ginga.

Dark Agents
Supporting antagonists of Ultraman Ginga, Dark Lugiel deploys his  to deliver Dark Dummy Sparks and Spark Dolls to any evil hearted ones in order for their master to feed on their darkness. Upon Lugiel's defeat, they wandered in space until two years later in Ginga S, where they detected their master's revival and returned to Earth. Once arrived, they welcomed Berume and Exceller's Chiburoids to form a legion called , as they attack human survivors from Vict Lugiel's assault but defeated by the combined forces of UPG members and Victorians. After the series ended, it was revealed that all of them except Berume and Chiburoids survived the fight but were put under UPG's custody and forced to work as janitors for punishments.
: The second dark agent to be awakened, Valky always had the tendency to dance and speak English words. He was defeated by the combination attack of Ginga and Jean-nine. In episode 8 of Shin Ultraman Retsuden, he is actually revealed to be the same Alien Valky from the last episode of Ultraman Taro instead of another incarnation, having known each other as greatest rivals and even mistake his former host, Kotaro Higashi as Taro himself as well.
: The third dark agent to be awakened, he was sent by Lugiel to collect Spark Dolls from the mountains. When Hikaru's group had the same intention, he stole the Spark Dolls they collected and DarkLived with the ones in his possession and himself into Tyrant. After Tyrant's defeat, Icarus was captured and interrogated but Lugiel managed to revert him into a Spark Doll to ensure his existence remain hidden.
: The fourth dark agent to be awakened, Alien Nackle Gray first trapped the Furuhoshi High School, Hikaru's group and almost everyone inside a space time continuum. During this time, he made his master harvesting the darkness of Seiichirō Isurugi and his accomplices, later targeted Misuzu as they DarkLived into Super Grand King, until Hikaru managed to return her to his side and turn both Gray and his monster to Spark Dolls.
: The first dark agent to be awakened, Alien Magma was actually rejected by Dark Lugiel in favor of Alien Valky. Since then, he tried his best to become worthy to his master but always bested by new minions until his demise. His loneliness became the catalyst for his plan to destroy Japan via Zetton. Until he was stopped by Ultraman Tiga (Kenta), Ultraman (Chigusa) and Ultraman Ginga. After his defeat, Alien Magma and Zetton desired to become Ginga's pupil and the Ultra agrees and brought them away from Earth.

Dark Zagi
 is one of the villains of Ultraman Ginga Theater Special. Long ago, he was one of the victims of Dark Spark War after being released by Dark Lugiel, he proceed to attack Jean-nine in mad fury until Ginga arrived as they battle on every portions of the world and defeated after returning to Japan. His Spark Doll was retrieved by Dark Lugiel afterwards, but like the rest, was freed, following Lugiel's demise.

First appeared in episode 37 of Ultraman Nexus and was introduced as an evil mockery/doppelgänger to the series' main Ultraman, Ultraman Noa.

Bug Rays
 were digital copies of five Dark Ultras created from software bugs in Tomoya's Live Pad and were the main antagonist of Ultraman Ginga Theater Special: Ultra Monster Hero Battle Royal!. They interrupted Hikaru and his gang while they were battling over the strongest UltLive, and all of them had been defeated by the teens after clashing their finishers.
: A dark replica of Ultraman Cosmos in Corona Mode, which previously appeared in episodes 39, 40 and 59. This Ultraman faces against Hikaru/Ultraman Ginga before being defeated.
: An evil Ultraman who previously appeared in episode 44 of Ultraman Tiga. He faced against Chigusa/Ultraman Tiga before being defeated.
: A dark replica of the original Ultraman that first appeared in Ultraman Fighting Evolution Rebirth. He faced against Tomoya/Ultraman before being defeated.
: A dark replica of Ultraseven that first appeared in Ultraman Fighting Evolution Rebirth. He faced against Kenta/Ultraseven before being defeated.
: A dark replica of Ultraman Taro that first appeared in Ultraman Fighting Evolution Rebirth. He faced against Misuzu/Ultraman Taro before being defeated.

Exceller
 is the main antagonist of Ultraman Ginga S. Stated to be a Spark Doll "Lived" from unknown source, his intention is to revive Dark Lugiel to seize his power and conquer Earth. He pilots an exosuit called  and hired a lot of "Lived" aliens aside from his android enforcer One-Zero and Chiburoids.

Near the final, he successfully revived Dark Lugiel and merged with UPG's Live Base into Vict Lugiel. But as it seems that he had the control over it, Dark Lugiel betrayed him by turning him back to a Spark Doll.

While physically portrayed in CGI, several scenes involving him out of his exosuit had Exceller portrayed by puppetry.

Exceller's minions
These aliens were originally Spark Dolls which brought to life by Exceller's technology and hired as his servants:
: The supporting antagonist, later promoted to the secondary antagonist in the second half. Self-proclaimed "the strongest alien in space", he is greatly loyal to Exceller and is armed with a Chibull Spark that allows him to use Spark Dolls, being the greatest user of them as he is capable of manifesting his own power. His position in the legion is put at odds with One-Zero, and finally taken over her position in the second half after she became a deserter. In episode 13, after his final attempt to attack the Ultramen failed, he becomes a giant rampaging alien by Exceller and was rescued by Ginga Strium. Bolst gives Ginga Strium the location of Exceller's base and forms a temporary alliance with him to take down the alien before they would fight again. However, before any actions can be made, he was killed by Arisa, who uses the UPG Live Base's Victorium Cannon during its test run. Bolst was voiced by Holly Kaneko, who previously voiced Father of Ultra in Ultraman Ginga. He is a tribute to the Alien Guts that appeared in episode 39 and 40 of Ultra Seven.
: An alien hired by Exceller. He tried to hypnotize a salaryman named Yoshida into becoming Gan Q but failed when the MonsLive process render the monster human-sized. After managing to control Yoshida/Gan-Q, they attacked Ginga and Victory but Gan Q once again broke from his power and hold the alien off for Ginga and Victory to finish. Meanwhile, his name is a Spanish for "death" and first appeared in episode 33 of Ultraman Leo.
: An alien that takes over Bolst's position after his death. He appears wearing a golden tuxedo and sent by Exceller to distract Ultramen Ginga Strium and Victory as Hyper Zetton via a Chibull Spark while his forces invade the UPG Live Base. Despite being defeated, he survived and teaming up with Dark Lugiel Rangers to attack the human survivors of Vict Lugiel but was defeated. He was nowhere to be seen afterwards, while the core members were under UPG's custody, becoming janitors as punishments. Previously prior to the premier of Ultraman Ginga S and his voicing as Berume, Yūki Ono was invited as a model to exhibit the UPG uniforms.

Chiburoids
 are Exceller's robot troops. They are usually encased in a spherical ball and uses guns as weapons. If given a Chibull Spark, they use it to MonsLive into .

Yapool
He has been hiding in Exceller's Vakishim Spark Doll and decides to work on his own to defeat the Ultras. His original attempt is to possess Gōki, a UPG officer and attacks several citizens but the latter tried his best to surpass his control until Ginga Strium freed him and killed Yapool with Ultraman Ace's Metallium Ray. He returned as the secondary antagonist of Ultra Fight Victory, where he was revived by his own resentment for Ultramen, stealing the energy of Victorium Core, kidnapping Ginga as his hostage and contemplates to revive Juda. His actions had drawn the attention of Ultraman King, who sent Leo, Astra, Ace and Hikari (later pass the baton to Victory) to stop him. Yapool was killed once again by Ultraman Gingavictory, but he manages to fully revives Juda with his own energy as a final act to enact revenge on them.

Victory Killer
 is a combat robot made by Yapool. Originally  whom Ace fought and defeated at Planet Golgotha, Yapool rebuilt it and upload Victory's battle tactics and was assigned to guard his prisoner, Ginga on Satellite Golgotha. Having defeated its old nemesis, Ultraman Ace, Victory Knight challenged and destroyed it with Knight Victorium Shoot.

While Victory Killer retained the abilities of past Ultra Brothers, it also gains a twisted version of Victory's Ultlance, called  and had use all these abilities: EX Red King Knuckle, Eleking Tail, King Joe Launcher, Gudon Whip, and Sadola Scissors.

The Killertlance announcements were voiced by Tesshō Genda, who also voiced Yapool.

Yapool's Terrible-Monsters
: One of the Spark Dolls in Lugiel's possession, Doragory was supposedly used by Kenta after being manipulated by Alien Valkie until Hikaru manages to bring him back to his senses. Doragory was used by Hikaru to fight Jean-killer/Tomoya before switching to Ultraman Ginga. It was freed from Dark Lugiel's curse, however , in Ginga S,  Exceller had Doragory in his collection of Spark Dolls. Whether it was the same one from Ginga or a copy is unknown. Doragory was utilized by Bolst until he was defeated by Victory. Yapool recreated this Terrible-Monster in Ultra Fight Victory as one of Juda's guardians in his revival until he was defeated by Astra.
: Originally a Spark Doll kept by Exceller, it was first used by One Zero to fight Ultraman Ginga until Yapool, who surprisingly inhabited the Spark Doll casts her out and kept Vakishim in his dimension. Vakishim was called again when Victory tries to search Yapool and was defeated by said Ultra. In Ultra Fight Victory, Yapool recreated this Terrible-Monster as one of Juda's guardians in his revival until he was defeated by the Ultraman Leo.
: Originally a Spark Doll kept by Exceller, it was first used by Bolst alongside Doragory until it was defeated by Victory. In Ultra Fight Victory, Yapool recreated this Terrible-Monster as one of Juda's guardians in his revival until he was defeated by Ultraman Ace.
: Used by Yapool to act as a pawn by attacking the Victorian civilization before Victory shows up, allowing the villain to analyse all of his UlTrance. Just as Aribunta overpowers Victory, he was saved by Ultraman Hikari, who gave him the Knight Timbre and becomes Ultraman Victory Knight to destroy the Terrible-Monster.
: Sent by Yapool to attack the imprisoned Ginga while Victory Knight fought Victory Killer, he quickly summoned Shepherdon to stop Lunaticks before it finishes the rabbit monster off.

Etelgar
 is the main antagonist of the movie. A gigantic golden space alien, he kidnapped Arina and brainwashed her into his servant. Together, the two travel with a space time castle and kidnapped Heisei Ultras through dimensions, with the recent one is Cosmos. Zero had sensed the threat and chased him to Ginga's world, where Etelgar almost had Ginga and Victory defeated. His power is to trap his targets fears into their fears via  and use his Etel-Dummy ability to create clones of his opponents' past enemies. After the Heisei Ultras are freed, Etelgar fought Gingavictory and was defeated in space. He would return in the Ultraman Hit Song History: New Generation Chapter and plots his revenge by capturing the New Generation Heisei Ultras.

Arina
 is the secondary antagonist of the Ginga S movie. She was a resident of Planet Zandt until she was captured by Etelgar. The villain brainwashed her into his servant by fabricating that her planet was destroyed by Ultramen and that he is her savior. In Ginga's world, she was purified by the energies of Victorium but Etelgar regains control of her until the Heisei Ultras were freed and Cosmos/Musashi rescued her again. In the aftermath of the battle, she was brought away by Cosmos/Musashi.

Both Arisa and Tatsuhisa were formerly known for portraying as Yoko Usami and Usada Lettuce in Tokumei Sentai Go-Busters.

Etel-Dummies
 are clones of past enemies that the Heisei Ultras faced created by Etelgar out of their own fears.
Dark Lugiel: Created by the citizens' fears, Dark Lugiel Etel-Dummy served as the first opponent for the newly introduced Ultraman Gingavictory, being easily overwhelmed by fusion Ultra Warrior and destroyed via Gingavictory Breaker.
Five King: An Etel-Dummy created by the combined fears of Ultraman Tiga, Dyna and Gaia, the three Ultra Warriors faced it on the urban area and put an end to it by using their alternate forms' powers: Tiga Power Type's Delacium Light Stream, Dyna Miracle Type's Revolium Wave and Gaia Supreme's Photon Stream.
: An Etel-Dummy created in the form of Ultraman Nexus's first nemesis, the Ultra Warrior faced him in the first floor of Etelgar's castle and destroyed him via Junis' Over-Ray Schtrom.
: An Etel-Dummy stationed in the second floor of Etelgar's castle, Max fought and destroyed him via Max Galaxy's Galaxy Sword.
: An Etel-Dummy stationed in the third floor of Etelgar's castle, Mebius fought and destroyed him via Mebium Burning Brave's Burning Mebium Dynamite.
: See here

Juda Spectre
 is the main antagonist of Ultra Fight Victory. Long ago, called as the  he was killed by Andro Melos and his team on Planet Guar. He becomes a huge space distortion which can be sensed in tens of thousand years, laying a huge impact on the galaxy. Yapool sees this as a chance to enact his revenge on the Ultramen and tries to revive him. As Yapool died during Juda's revival, the tyrant unleashes Super Grand King Spectre and fights Ultraman Victory Knight but as it seems that he will win the fight, the Victorium Core that Yapool stole to feed him begins to assist Victory Knight and rebel against Juda, allowing Victory Knight to kill him with knight Victorium Break.

Super Grand King Spectre
 is Juda Spectre's monster. Originally the  that was killed by the Ultra Brothers in Ultraman Story, it was recreated by Juda into a more golden appearance and armed with Bat Calibre, a similar sword that its master wielded. It attacked the Leo Brothers, Ace, and Ginga but after weakened by the Victorium Core, the Ultramen proceeded to attack again, finally killing it.

Other Spark Doll Monsters and Aliens

Ultraman Ginga
As a result of the Dark Spark War, every combatants were transformed into Spark Dolls. This list covers other monsters and aliens that transformed into Spark Dolls. Six of Hikaru's Spark Dolls (Black King, Thunder Darambia, Kemur, King Pandon, Ragon and Ultraman Taro) starred in the mini-corner Spark Dolls Theatre at the end of the episodes. Followed by Lugiel's destruction, they were released from the curse and flew back to space.

: The first monster Spark Doll to be sighted, it was picked by Hikaru while he went hiking on the mountains. After failing to Ultlive Ultraman Taro, he accidentally used the Spark Doll and becomes said monster in process, and attempted to stop Thunder Darambia before he swap it with Ultraman Ginga. Hikaru soon used it again against Dark Galberos but loses in a boxing match. First appeared in episodes 37 and 38 of Return of Ultraman.
: One of the Spark Dolls in Lugiel's possession to appear, Thunder Darambia was awakened after Alien Valkie manipulate Yamada and Kimura into using its Spark Dolls. Thunder Darambia first fight Hikaru/Black King, before the youth switched to Ultraman Ginga and reverted the monster to a Spark Doll to be reclaimed by him. During the first fight against Kemur, Hikaru uses Thunder Darambia but incapable of catching up with the alien's speed until he chooses Ginga.  In the Spark Dolls Theatre, Thunder Darambia was voiced by Kenta Matsumoto, who would voice the young Ultraman Taro in this series and Ultraman Max in Ultraman Ginga S: The Movie. Thunder Darambia is a tribute to (Neo) Darambia that appeared in episodes 1, 2 and 49 of Ultraman Dyna.
: One of the Spark Dolls in Lugiel's possession, Kemur awakened after Alien Valkie manipulate Yagami into using its Spark Dolls. It tries to chase Misuzu and stopped by Hikaru, turning giant and faced the youth in Thunder Darambia but defeated by Ultraman Ginga and reverted to a Spark Doll. It was used by Hikaru to put out the flames set by Yuka and faced her as King Pandon before switching to Ginga. In the Spark Dolls Theatre, Kemur was voiced by Kōichi Toshima. First appeared in episode 19 of Ultra Q.
: One of the Spark Dolls in Lugiel's possession, King Pandon awakened after Alien Valkie manipulate Yuka into using its Spark Dolls. It tried to burn the Furuhoshi Elementary School but stopped by Hikaru/Kemur before the youth switched to Ultraman Ginga to revert it to Spark Doll. Hikaru uses the doll to stop Chigusa/Ragon before he swapped into Ginga. King Pandon is a tribute to Pandon that appeared in episode 47 and 48 of Ultra Seven.
: One of the Spark Dolls in Lugiel's possession, Ragon awakened after Alien Valkie manipulate Chigusa into using its Spark Dolls. It tried to attack Misuzu out of jealousy for being picked as an idol and turns large, facing Hikaru/King Pandon before the youth swapped into Ultraman Ginga and separate Ragon from Chigusa. In the Spark Dolls Theatre, Ragon is voiced by Akiko Tanaka. First appeared in episode 21 of Ultra Q.
: A monster created by the combination of Alien Icarus and six other Spark Dolls, Tyrant proceeds to attack Hikaru and his friends until he was stopped and defeated by Hikaru/Ultraman Tiga and Tomoya/Jean-nine, reverting to Alien Icarus and the Spark Dolls. First appeared in episode 40 of Ultraman Taro. The other six Spark Dolls that were used to make up Tyrant other than Alien Icarus are:
: Founded by Misuzu at the mountains, Red King was among those that stolen by Icarus to become Tyrant until his defeat had the doll landed on Hikaru's hands. Misuzu uses Red King with the Ginga Light Spark to assist Ultraman Ginga in battling against Shingo/Zaragas. First appeared in episode 8 of Ultraman.
: One of the Spark Dolls in Lugiel's possession, it was lend to Alien Icarus and is a part of the Tyrant formation, until his defeat had the doll landed in Hikaru's hands.
: One of the Spark Dolls in Lugiel's possession, it was lend to Alien Icarus and is a part of the Tyrant formation, until his defeat had the doll landed in Hikaru's hands.
: Founded by Hikaru and Misuzu at the mountains, Barabas was among those that stolen by Icarus to become Tyrant until his defeat had the doll landed on Hikaru's hands.
: Founded by Alien Icarus at the mountains, King Crab was among those that stolen by Icarus to become Tyrant until his defeat had the doll landed on Hikaru's hands.
: Founded by Hikaru and Chigusa at the mountains, Hanzagiran was among those that stolen by Icarus to become Tyrant until his defeat had the doll landed on Hikaru's hands.
: One of the Spark Dolls in Lugiel's possession, Dark Galberos was awakened when Alien Nackle Gray manipulated Gō into using the Spark Doll. Dark Galberos battles Hikaru in a boxing match and wins the first round after failing to use Black King but loses when the youth swaps to Ginga. It is a tribute to Galberos from episodes 6, 17, 18 and 35 of Ultraman Nexus.
: One of the Spark Dolls in Lugiel's possession, Zaragas was awakened when Alien Nackle Gray manipulated Shingo into using the Spark Doll. It battles Red King and reverted by Ultraman Ginga. First appeared in episode 36 of Ultraman.
: One of the Spark Dolls in Lugiel's possession, Antlar was awakened when Alien Nackle Gray manipulated Tomomi into using the Spark Doll. She easily defeated Hikaru's friends in Jashrin but before she was about to battle Ginga, Ultra Seven Dark/Seiichirō betrayed her by reverting her to Spark Doll, claiming her too weak. First appeared in episode 7 of Ultraman.
: A Spark Doll in Hotsuma's possession, he gave it to Misuzu, Kenta and Chigusa for them to fight Tomomi/Antlar when Hikaru was decommissioned from being hit by Ultra Seven Dark. First appeared in episode 37 of Ultraman Mebius.
: One of the Spark Dolls in Lugiel's possession, Super Grand King was awakened when Alien Nackle Gray manipulated Misuzu into using the Spark Doll along with him. The two as Super Grand King manages to defeat Ultraman/Chigusa, Ultra Seven/Seiichirō, Ultraman Tiga/Kenta and Jean-nine/Tomoya until Hikaru manages to pursue Misuzu back to him and the two as Ginga obliterate Super Grand King, at the same time defeating Gray as well. He is a tribute to Grand King from in Ultraman Story.
: A Spark Doll in Alien Magma's possession, he used it after failing to get Chigusa under his control. He tried to use Zetton to destroy Japan but was stopped by Ultraman (Chigusa), Ultraman Tiga (Kenta) and Ultraman Ginga. Zetton and Magma soon asks for apprenticeship on Ginga as he agrees and brought them to space. First appeared in episode 39 of Ultraman.

Ultraman Ginga S
All Spark Dolls in this series were copies kept by Exceller in his ship, given that original ones were already reverted and returned to their homeworlds in the last season.
: First used by One Zero to guard a stolen Victorium, she fought Shepherdon and Ultraman Victory until Ginga appeared and destroyed it. However, the Spark Doll was claimed by Victory, who utilized it as one of his UlTrance, EX Red King Knuckle. Hikaru borrowed it from Show to fight Five King while UPG members were reviving Ultramen Ginga and Victory. First appeared in episode 13 of Ultra Galaxy Mega Monster Battle: Never Ending Odyssey.
: First used by One Zero to steal electricities in the suburban area in the night and guard a stolen Victorium during the next day, it was defeated by Ultraman Victory, who was assisted by Ginga. The doll were claimed by Show, who used it as part of Victory's UlTrance, Eleking Tail. Hikaru borrowed it from Show to fight Five King while UPG members were reviving Ultramen Ginga and Victory. First appeared in episode 3 of Ultra Seven.
: First used by Bolst to support the Inpelaizer (Chiburoid) army. It managed to overpower Victory but defeated by Ultraman Ginga, who used his newfound power, Ultraman Ginga Strium. The Spark Doll was claimed by Hikaru before he gave it to Shou, who would use it as part of Victory's UlTrance, King Joe Launcher. Hikaru borrowed it sometime later to fight Five King while UPG members were reviving Ultramen Ginga and Victory.
: First used by One Zero to challenge the Ultramen, it fought Victory and got the upper hand after his UlTrance went wrong. It was defeated and claimed by Ultraman Ginga Strium, later used by Hikaru to rescue Lepi from Gudon (One Zero) until he gives it to Shou for Victory to utilize Sadola Scissors. First appeared in episode 3 of Return of Ultraman.
: First used by One Zero to guard a stolen Victorium, it was defeated by Ultraman Victory and claimed the Spark Doll for his Ultrance, Gudon Whip. First appeared in episode 5 of Return of Ultraman.
: First used by Hiyori to enact her revenge on the Victorians, it first fight Ginga Strium before she defected and attack Fire Golza (One Zero) instead. It was returned to a Spark Doll and its current location is unknown. First appeared in episodes 26 and 27 of Ultraman.
: A gigantic combination monster created and MonsLived by Exceller by combining five Spark Dolls. It ambushed the exhausted Ginga Strium and Victory and killed both Ultras at ease. Soon, Exceller deployed it again on a rampaging spree, easily resisting all three monsters Hikaru UltLived (EX Red King, Eleking and King Joe Custom) but defeated by the revived Ultras. Among the components of Five King are:
: First used by One Zero to assist Gomora (Hiyori) against Ginga Strium but betrayed by Gomora and defeated by Victory. After she retrieved the Spark Doll, Bolst used it alongside Gan-Q to absorb Shepherdon's energy for Exceller to create Five King until Fire Golza were defeated by Ginga Strium. First appeared as Golza in episode 1 and as Fire Golza (Powered Golza at that time) in episode 18 of Ultraman Tiga.

: First used by Bolst alongside Fire Golza to rob Shepherdon's Victorium energies before being defeated by the Magnewave Cannon used by Captain Yoshiaki Jinno. Later, a salaryman named Yoshida was forced to use it by Alien Akumania Muerte, trapping him in this monster human-sized, until Muerte controls him again in human size. But Gan-Q (Yoshida) breaks free from his control and hold Muerte off for Ultramen Ginga and Victory to finish. The doll is last seen in the hands of a boy that Yoshida taught to ride a bicycle and keeps it as his keepsake. First appeared in episode 6 of Ultraman Gaia.

Giant Space Monster Bemstar (9): First used by Bolst alongside Bemular to guard a stolen Victorium and attack UPG members. Bemstar was finally defeated when Victory sent it flying with EX Red King Knuckle. First appeared in episode 18 of Return of Ultraman.
: First used by Bolst alongside Bemstar to guard a stolen Victorium. Bemular was finally defeated by Ultraman Ginga Strium. First appeared in episode 1 of Ultraman.
: First used by Bolst to attack Chigusa and Alien Metron Jace. Eventually, Zoa Muruchi was defeated by the Ultramen after Jace distracted it. First appeared in episode 33 of Return of Ultraman.
: First used by Bolst to wreak havoc in the countryside before being defeated by Victory. First appeared in episodes 17 and 18 of Ultraman Taro.
: First used by Berume, his mission is to act as a diversion for UPG and Ultramen while Exceller invades the UPG Live Base. Hyper Zetton was defeated by Ultraman Ginga Strium and his Spark Doll were utilized by Ultraman Victory's Ultlance for Hyper Zetton Scissors. First appeared in Ultraman Saga.

Notes

References

External links
Ultraman Ginga characters at Tsuburaya Productions 
Ultraman Ginga S casts at Tsuburaya Productions 
Ultraman Ginga S characters at Tsuburaya Productions 
Ultra Fight Victory characters at Tsuburaya Productions 

Television characters introduced in 2013
Ginga